Niramaala is a 1975 Indian Malayalam film,  directed and produced by P. Ramdas. The film stars KPAC Lalitha, Raghavan, Priya and Jameela Malik in the lead roles. The film has musical score by M. K. Arjunan.

Cast

KPAC Lalitha
Raghavan
Priya
Jameela Malik
Kalamandalam Kshemavathy
Latha
Nellikode Bhaskaran
Premji
Ravi Menon
Santha Devi
Sujatha

Soundtrack
The music was composed by M. K. Arjunan and the lyrics were written by Yusufali Kechery and O. Ramdas.

References

External links
 

1975 films
1970s Malayalam-language films